Human Rights Day is celebrated annually around the world on 10 December every year.

The date was chosen to honor the United Nations General Assembly's adoption and proclamation, on 10 December 1948, of the Universal Declaration of Human Rights (UDHR), the first global enunciation of human rights and one of the first major achievements of the new United Nations. The formal establishment of Human Rights Day occurred at the 317th Plenary Meeting of the General Assembly on 4 December 1950, when the General Assembly declared resolution 423(V), inviting all member states and any other interested organizations to celebrate the day as they saw fit.

The day is normally marked both by high-level political conferences and meetings and by cultural events and exhibitions dealing with human rights issues. Besides, it is traditionally on 10 December that the five-yearly United Nations Prize in the Field of Human Rights and Nobel Peace Prize are awarded. Many governmental and non-governmental organizations active in the human rights field also schedule special events to commemorate the day, as do many civil and social-cause organisations.

History

Human Rights Day is the day in 1948 the United Nations General Assembly adopted the Universal Declaration of Human Rights.

The formal inception of Human Rights Day dates from 1950, after the Assembly passed resolution 423(V) inviting all States and interested organisations to adopt 10 December of each year as Human Rights Day. The popularity of the day can be shown by the fact that the commemorative Human Rights Day stamp issued by the United Nations Postal Administration in 1952, received approximately 200,000 advance orders.

When the General Assembly adopted the Declaration, with 48 states in favor and eight abstentions, it was proclaimed as a "common standard of achievement for all peoples and all nations", towards which individuals and societies should "strive by progressive measures, national and international, to secure their universal and effective recognition and observance". The measure was received by both advocates and critics alike as "being more declarative than legislative, more suggestive than binding."

Although the Declaration with its broad range of political, civil, economic, social and cultural rights is not a binding document, it inspired more than 60 human rights instruments which together constitute an international standard of human rights. Today the general consent of all United Nations Member States on the basic Human Rights laid down in the Declaration makes it even stronger and emphasizes the relevance of Human Rights in our daily lives.

The High Commissioner for Human Rights, as the main United Nations rights official and his Office plays a major role in coordinating efforts for the yearly observation of Human Rights Day:

The 60th anniversary of the Universal Declaration of Human Rights occurred on 10 December 2008, and the UN Secretary-General launched a year-long campaign leading up to this anniversary. Because the UDHR holds the world record as the most translated document (except for the Bible), organizations around the globe used the year to focus on helping people everywhere learn about their rights.

On 9 December 2001, President George W. Bush made a Presidential proclamation that Human Rights Week began on 9 December. He also made the same proclamation on 10 December 2008.

Past observances

Date variance
In South Africa, Human Rights Day is celebrated on 21 March, in remembrance of the Sharpeville massacre which took place on 21 March 1960. This massacre occurred as a result of protests against the Apartheid regime in South Africa. South African Human Rights Day was declared a national holiday when the ANC was elected as the government with Nelson Mandela as the first democratically elected leader. Parliament's role on this day is to empower the people so that the democratic processes becomes known to all South Africans.

It is celebrated on 11 December in Kiribati.

See also
 HumanLight
 International observance
 International Day in Support of Victims of Torture
 Stalker International Film Festival on Human Rights
 World Humanitarian Day
 World Humanist Day
 United Nations

References

External links
 
 Vice-Chancellor Sangam University Bhilwara Speaks on Human Rights Day at JMA Pilani Rajasthan

Human rights
Civil awareness days
United Nations days
December observances